Jane Victoria Atkinson  is Executive Director of Engineering and Automation at Bilfinger UK.

Education
Atkinson studied chemical engineering at Loughborough University, and in 2011 she received an honorary doctorate in business administration from Teesside University.

Career
Her career began as a sponsored engineering student with British Steel in 1990. On completion of her first degree she worked as a technical advisor at the Teesside blast furnace before moving into operations, becoming the first woman in the world to manage a blast furnace in 2004 – the Corus cast house at Redcar. She was later the second woman in the world to manage a coke oven.

During her time in the steel industry she managed many major production units and spent five years with the company in Alabama in the USA.

She later became Senior Vice President Utilities Operations at SembCorp Utilities UK. Moving to Cape plc in 2014 she was eventually responsible for its merger with Hertel and NSG to create Altrad.  She moved to Bilfinger in 2019.

Honours

The CBI honoured her as Britain’s top female engineer in 2007 and in 2010 she became the youngest woman Fellow of the Royal Academy of Engineering.
 In 2019 she was recognised as the first of the 100 top women leaders in engineering in the UK.
 She is also a Fellow of IChemE and has chartered and designated European Engineer status.

References

Living people
British chemical engineers
Fellows of the Royal Academy of Engineering
Alumni of Loughborough University
British women engineers
Female Fellows of the Royal Academy of Engineering
20th-century British engineers
21st-century British engineers
20th-century women engineers
21st-century women engineers
Year of birth missing (living people)